The 2010 Nebraska Cornhuskers football team represented the University of Nebraska in the 2010 NCAA Division I FBS football season. The team was coached by Bo Pelini and played their home games at Memorial Stadium in Lincoln, Nebraska. They were members of the North Division of the Big 12 Conference. It was Nebraska's 102nd and last season in the Big 12 (including years in the MVIAA/Big Eight) as they began competing in the Big Ten Conference in 2011.

The Cornhuskers finished the season 10–4, 6–2 in the Big 12 and were co champions of the North Division with Missouri. Due to their victory over Missouri, Nebraska represented the North Division in the 2010 Big 12 Championship Game where they were defeated by Oklahoma 20–23. They were invited to the Holiday Bowl for the second consecutive season and played Washington. Despite defeating the Huskies 56–21 during the regular season, the Cornhuskers were defeated 19–7.

Before the season
The 2010 Cornhuskers took to the field on Saturday, September 4, 2010 against the Western Kentucky Hilltoppers. The Cornhuskers carried on despite losing a handful of key personnel losses to graduation after 2009, especially Heisman-candidate and #2 overall NFL draft pick DT Ndamukong Suh.  The Nebraska coaching staff remained intact for the third straight year, since the return of Bo Pelini to the program.

During the spring of this year, several NCAA Football Bowl Subdivision teams began publicly discussing potential conference changes, which ultimately gained enough momentum to set off a chain reaction of university conference affiliation changes.  On June 11, 2010, the University of Nebraska–Lincoln announced that its regents unanimously voted to end the university's affiliation with the Big 12 Conference, and would be joining the Big Ten Conference.  The Big Ten Conference unanimously approved Nebraska's official application just hours later, and Nebraska announced that the Cornhusker athletic programs would transition into the Big Ten conference play schedule effective July 1, 2011.  This is Nebraska's last year playing in the Big 12 Conference.

Nebraska's preseason #8 AP ranking was the highest starting rank for Nebraska since Eric Crouch's 2001 Heisman trophy season, which ultimately saw the Cornhuskers playing Miami in the BCS National Championship Game at the Rose Bowl.

Recruiting

Schedule

Roster and coaching staff

Game summaries

Western Kentucky

This was the first ever meeting of the Hilltoppers and Cornhuskers.  Redshirt Freshman QB Taylor Martinez was not revealed as the starter for Nebraska until kickoff, and subsequently became the first freshman quarterback to open a Nebraska season in the history of the program.  On his first carry, Martinez rushed for 46 yards and a touchdown, allowing for Nebraska to extend its ongoing NCAA record of consecutive season-opening victories to 25. Martinez's 129 rushing yards on the day also marked the first time a Nebraska QB exceeded 100 yards on the ground since 2003, and this was accomplished while sharing snaps with the second and third string quarterbacks.  The 2010 Blackshirts debut was marred somewhat when they allowed the Western Kentucky squad, which had lost their last 20 games in a row prior to this game, to accumulate 299 all-purpose yards, mostly during a second-half defensive letdown.

Idaho

For the sixth straight year, Nebraska opened the season 2–0.  The 38–17 defeat of the Idaho Vandals in the first ever meeting of these teams improved the Cornhuskers to 22–1 against WAC opponents all-time. The Nebraska defense held the Vandals to just 60 yards on the ground and 279 total yards, while notching seven sacks for 80 yards lost.  The Blackshirts intercepted five passes, three of which were converted into scores.  A 28–3 scoring output in the 2nd quarter allowed the Cornhuskers to run away with the game and play some reserve personnel, which allowed the Vandals to outscore Nebraska 14–7 in the second half. The Nebraska offense recorded 471 all-purpose yards. The home field win was Nebraska's 375th at Memorial Stadium, and the 500th home win in Lincoln all-time.  Nebraska redshirt freshman QB Taylor Martinez had a second straight 100-yard rushing game, and his 67-yard second-quarter touchdown was the longest by a Nebraska QB since a 70-yard dash by Eric Crouch against Colorado in 2001.  Cornhusker PK Alex Henery accounted for eight points on the day, which was enough to make him the fifth Nebraska player to ever exceed 300 career points. Despite the win, Nebraska slipped from #6 to #8 in the AP Poll following the game.

Washington, September 2010

The game against Washington was led by Steve Sarkisian, who took over in 2009. This was Nebraska's first road game of the 2010 season. The game featured redshirt freshman Martinez QB Washington QB Jake Locker.

Washington received the ball to start the game but gave up an interception four plays later, just 1:35 into the game. Shortly thereafter Nebraska scored a touchdown and never gave up the lead for the rest of the game. The Cornhuskers finished the day with 533 all-purpose yards, more than double Washington's totals in each category. This included three Nebraska players totaling over 100 yards of rushing, an accomplishment not met since 2001 and only the fourth time ever in program history. It was also the first time Washington had ever allowed three opponent players to exceed 100 rushing yards. The Cornhusker offense managed over 13 yards per pass attempt and over 7 yards per rush attempt, while the 56 total Nebraska points was the most points ever scored by a non-conference opponent in Husky Stadium's 90-year history, also tying the most points ever scored there by a Washington conference opponent.  An 80-yard touchdown run in the 3rd quarter by Nebraska QB Taylor Martinez was the longest TD run by a freshman QB, and the second-longest run by any Nebraska QB, in program history.  The Blackshirts coverage prevented the Huskies from ever getting consistent momentum, and Locker ended the day only 4 of 20 in the air for 70 yards and two interceptions, one of which was returned for a Nebraska TD by junior CB Alfonzo Dennard. Washington did manage to end Nebraska's 10-game streak of holding opponents to 20 points. Nebraska took over the series by moving to 4–3–1 against Washington all time.

South Dakota State

Meeting for the first time since a 58–7 Nebraska victory in 1963, the FCS South Dakota State Jackrabbits entered the game at 0–2. The 307th consecutive sellout crowd at Memorial Stadium was the largest crowd that the Jackrabbits team had ever played in front of, and the last two teams to hold Nebraska to fewer than 17 points had been the #20 Oklahoma Sooners and #3 Texas Longhorns.  The game was closer than the 17–3 score would indicate, as the Jackrabbits had two touchdowns nullified by penalties, one of them on an interception returned 66 yards to the end zone. Both teams suffered two interceptions each and Nebraska offered up four fumbles on the day, losing one of them to a fumble-free South Dakota State.  Nebraska held the time of possession edge on the game by 11 seconds, and converted four of thirteen third downs. Cornhusker head coach Pelini summed up the Nebraska effort after the game, saying "We were a bad team."  Nonetheless, the win moved the Cornhuskers to 2–0 over the Jackrabbits all time, and put Nebraska at 4–0 for the first time since 2005.

Kansas State

Nebraska met Kansas State in Manhattan to open the final Cornhusker Big 12 Conference slate and the 95th time the teams had met. Redshirt freshman Nebraska QB Taylor Martinez bounced back from his lackluster appearance in the previous contest against South Dakota State, rushing for four touchdowns and 241 yards to set a new all-time Cornhusker quarterback single-game rushing record. His 370 total yards on the day were the most all-purpose yards set by a Cornhusker freshman at any position in nineteen years.  Martinez's efforts helped Nebraska to tally more yards against Kansas State than any other opponent in twenty one years. The Wildcat offense seemed to have success to start the game, marching down the field on their first possession, until they were stopped on a 4th-and-2 in the Nebraska red zone with no points to show for it.  The Blackshirts subsequently took control of the game defensively, notching their 13th straight game holding an opponent to 21 points or less and helping the Cornhuskers to hand Kansas State head coach Bill Snyder a home field loss, in the stadium named after him, on his 71st birthday.  The Nebraska win moved the Cornhuskers to 5–0 for the first time since 2003, and the series between the programs drew to a close with a Nebraska advantage of 78–15–2.

Texas

The teams came head-to-head for the 14th time with Texas defeating #5 Nebraska in Lincoln. The loss left Nebraska with a 4–10 record against Texas all time, and just 1–9 in the last ten attempts. With Nebraska's departure from the Big 12 Conference following this season, this was the last regular season league meeting of these teams.

Oklahoma State

The Cornhuskers traveled to Stillwater following a disappointing loss to Texas the week prior, hoping to bounce back against their first ranked opponent of the year, the #17 Oklahoma State Cowboys. Nebraska QB Taylor Martinez eclipsed the 300-yard mark through the air for the first time in his career, passing for 323 yards and five touchdowns, while adding 112 yards on the ground.

Nebraska's victory improved the Cornhuskers' series lead to 37–5–1, but was only Nebraska's second win in the last five matches between the squads. Their first win in Stillwater since 1995. With Nebraska's departure from the Big 12 Conference following this season, this was the last league meeting of these teams in a series that dates back to when the Cowboys briefly joined the MVIAA from 1925 to 1928. Oklahoma State later returned to the league for good in 1958, leading the conference to be known as the "Big 8" for the first time.

Missouri

#7 Missouri arrived in Lincoln to take on Nebraska for the 104th contest between the schools since 1892, trying to make progress to catch up to Nebraska in the series. The Tigers trail behind the Cornhuskers 36–65–3 all-time.

Nebraska's withdrawal from Big 12 play after this year ends a historical league affiliation with the Tigers that dates to 1892, when these two programs joined with Kansas and Iowa to form the Western Interstate University Football Association (WIUFA).  Though the WIUFA disbanded after six seasons, all four WIUFA teams came together again with the formation of the MVIAA in 1907.  The conclusion of the 2010 season will mark the end of a 103-year continuous conference partnership, and leaves the fate of the Victory Bell in question.

Iowa State

Second-year Iowa State Head Coach Paul Rhoads hosted Nebraska in Ames for the first time, as the squads come together for their 105th contest. With Nebraska leaving Big 12 play after this season, this game marked the end of a historical series and conference relationship dating back to 1896, almost as far back as the Nebraska-Missouri series. Nebraska, who leads the all-time series 86–17–2, avenged last year's 7–9 loss, which was Iowa State's first win in Lincoln in 34 years. Nebraska and Iowa State traded scores in the 4th quarter before Nebraska led 31–24 in the final minutes. Iowa State scored a touchdown to make the score 31–30 Nebraska leading. ISU Head Coach Paul Rhoads called a 2-point conversion. With the game on the line, ISU QB Austen Arnaud threw a pass that got intercepted by Nebraska DB Eric Hagg to give Nebraska the overtime win in Ames.

Kansas

Kansas traveled to Lincoln to play the 105th and last game in the NCAA-record longest consecutive season series in all of college football.  This game marked the 117th time overall that the teams have come together to settle things on the field.  Nebraska's victory leaves the series closed for now with a decisive Cornhusker advantage of 91–23–3. It was the first meeting between Kansas and Nebraska since the Jayhawk program was taken over by former legendary Nebraska quarterback Turner Gill.

The departure of Nebraska from the Big 12 marked this game as the probable last game of one of the longest continuous series in the history of NCAA college football, as Kansas and Nebraska have met on the field every year without interruption since 1903, and failed to meet in only two seasons overall since 1892.

Texas A&M

With Nebraska's departure from the Big 12 Conference following this season, this was the last league meeting of these two teams. The Cornhuskers were penalized 16 times for 145 yards and lost the game 9–6. Several of the calls were controversial, and played key role in the outcome of the game. For example, Texas A&M player Tony Jerod-Eddie grabbed and squeezed the testicles of Nebraska player Ben Cotton when he recovered a fumble, and Cotton was flagged 15 yards when he tried to protect himself.

Following the Cornhuskers' defeat by the Aggies, Nebraska Defensive Coordinator Carl Pelini was involved in an incident with Brandon Jones, a co-owner of a Texas A&M sports site, TexAgs. The photographer stated that Pelini had seized Brandon's camera and broken several pieces from it before throwing them to the ground. Video shows Pelini rushing towards the photographer and camera.

Colorado

Colorado traveled to Lincoln as both teams closed their regular seasons. Nebraska steadily pulled away for the win to clinch the Big 12 Conference North Division Title and a berth in the Big 12 Championship game.  Colorado was denied a sixth win for the season and did not attain bowl eligibility, making this the final game of their 2010 season.  As 2010 was the final year for both teams in the Big 12, the long-running series has drawn to a close with Nebraska in command at 49–18–2.

Oklahoma

For the second year in a row, Nebraska appeared in the Big 12 football championship game.  The team would play their final game as members of the Big 12 against Oklahoma in Arlington, Texas. Nebraska led 17–0 at one point in the first half, before Oklahoma reeled off 17 points of their own. A field goal just before halftime sent Nebraska into halftime with a 20–17 lead. In the second half, Oklahoma held Nebraska scoreless for the first time of the season and managed two field goals in each of the latter periods to win 23–20. Nebraska had 4 turnovers in the game and Oklahoma held a 453–293 yard disadvantage.

Washington–Holiday Bowl

Following Nebraska's loss to Oklahoma, Nebraska was selected as the Big 12's representative at the 2010 Holiday Bowl, which also chose the Washington squad beaten by Nebraska in September, now 6–6, to appear as the final opponent in the Cornhuskers 2010 season. This was Nebraska's second straight Holiday Bowl appearance. Washington had rebounded from a 3–6 start and the demoralizing early season loss to Nebraska, winning out the rest of their season to earn a bowl bid. The Huskies held Nebraska to a single first-half touchdown on their way to winning 19–7.

Rankings

After the season
Although there were high hopes for the year, three major goals were not achieved and resulted in a season that ended with a note of disappointment.  After the last-second, one-point loss to Texas in the 2009 Big 12 Championship Game, the squad looked forward to a chance to avenge the loss against the Longhorns and to return to the league title game for the final Big 12 conference championship.  The 2010 Big 12 Championship game was the last league title game for the foreseeable future, as the departure of Nebraska and Colorado from the league dropped the number of members to ten, which is not enough to hold a title game under NCAA rules.

Texas started the season flat and had to face unbeaten Nebraska in Lincoln, which led many media analysts to predict an easy Nebraska win.  Instead, Texas took advantage of Cornhusker mistakes to deny Nebraska a win in the final foreseeable match between the teams.  The Cornhuskers remained on track for an appearance in the Big 12 championship game, clinching an appearance against historical rival Oklahoma.  The Cornhuskers started strong and led 17–0 in the second quarter before the Sooners rallied for 23 points while holding Nebraska to just one more field goal.  Having also lost to Texas A&M in the regular season, the 10–3 Nebraska team was invited to the Holiday Bowl for a rematch with Washington.

Head coach Bo Pelini, 3–0 in bowls all time, was handed his first ever bowl loss at the hands of an inspired Husky squad, and Nebraska suffered its third loss in the previous four games, a mark last seen since the first part of 2008.  Nonetheless, Pelini's overall record improved on the season, to 30–12 (.714) overall, and 17–7 (.708) in the Big 12, and his team won the Big 12 North Division title in each of his three seasons at the helm so far.  This was not as successful a start as the programs of successful former head coaches Bob Devaney, Tom Osborne, or Frank Solich, but was a dramatic improvement over the first three years of his immediate predecessor, Bill Callahan.  Callahan managed to get to just 22–15 (.595) overall and 13–11 (.542) in the league, with only a single division championship.  Although 2010 ended on a disappointing note following Pelini's 2009 proclamation that "Nebraska was back", it was apparent that Nebraska's fortunes had improved since Pelini's 2007 arrival.

Draft picks, signees, or other future professional players
 Prince Amukamara, 2011 1st–round pick of the New York Giants
 DeJon Gomes, 2011 5th–round pick of the Washington Redskins
 Eric Hagg, 2011 7th–round pick of the Cleveland Browns
 Roy Helu, 2011 4th–round pick of the Washington Redskins
 Alex Henery, 2011 4th–round pick of the Philadelphia Eagles
 Ricky Henry, 2011 UFL 1st–round pick of the Hartford Colonials
 D.J. Jones, 2011 UFL 6th–round pick of the Omaha Nighthawks
 Niles Paul, 2011 5th–round pick of the Washington Redskins
 Mike Smith, 2011 UFL 5th–round pick of the Omaha Nighthawks
 Keith Williams, 2011 6th–round pick of the Pittsburgh Steelers

In popular culture
The team was referenced in the season 6 Better Call Saul episode Nippy. Protagonist Saul Goodman discusses the team's fortunes with a mall security guard to distract him while an acquaintance robs a clothing store.

References

Nebraska
Nebraska Cornhuskers football seasons
Nebraska Cornhuskers football